The 2014 Formula D season, officially titled the Formula Drift Pro Championship, was the eleventh season of the Formula D series. The season began on April 4 at Long Beach and ended on October 11 at Irwindale Speedway.

2009 champion Chris Forsberg was able to clinch his second Formula D title, finishing 11.5 points clear of his nearest rival, Fredric Aasbø. Forsberg, the event winner at Long Beach, went into the final round with a 26-point advantage but Aasbø – a winner at Wall Township Speedway and Texas Motor Speedway – closed slightly in the standings. Third place in the championship was another two-time event winner, Vaughn Gittin, who was the winner at Road Atlanta and Homestead-Miami Speedway. Other victories were taken by Darren McNamara at Evergreen Speedway while Daigo Saito was victorious at Irwindale Speedway. Scion were the winners of the Manufacturers' Cup, finishing 122 points clear of Nissan, while in the Tire Cup, Hankook finished clear of Nitto by a tally of 283.5 points.

Schedule

Calendar changes
 Starting in 2014, the third round event was moved from Palm Beach International Raceway to Homestead-Miami Speedway. A round of Formula D had been held at the Palm Beach International Raceway since the 2011 season.

Results and standings

Championship standings
Event winners in bold.

Manufacturer Cup

Tire Cup

References

External links
 

Formula D seasons
Formula D